Chrysiptera galba, commonly known as the canary demoiselle, is a species of damselfish. It is native to the western Pacific Ocean. It reaches 7 centimeters in length. The male guards and tends the eggs.

In aquarium
It is a rare species which needs special care.

References

galba
Fish described in 1974